Andrew Sheldon may refer to:

Andrew Sheldon, co-founder of True North Productions
Andrew Sheldon, character in Adventure in Baltimore
Andy Sheldon, musician in The Samples

See also
Andrew Shelton (disambiguation)